Thomas Troelsen (born 6 October 1981) is a Danish singer, songwriter, and producer from Skive. Troelsen has written and produced songs for Pitbull, Flo Rida, Justin Bieber, David Guetta, Lil Wayne, Drengene fra Angora, Nile Rodgers, Jason Derulo, Charlie Puth, Chris Brown, Afrojack, Akon, Meghan Trainor, Girls' Generation, SHINee, EXO, NCT Dream and Junior Senior.

In 2018, Troelsen co-wrote "Say My Name" by David Guetta featuring J Balvin and Bebe Rexha. He also co-wrote, co-produced and is a featured vocalist on the Lil Wayne song "Can't Be Broken" from the platinum album Tha Carter V.

In 2016, Troelsen co-wrote "I Love Me" by Meghan Trainor and This One's For You by David Guetta featuring Zara Larsson, the UEFA 2016 official song.

In 2015, Troelsen co-wrote the song "Company" by Justin Bieber from his album Purpose. He also wrote 3 songs for Flo Rida, including the single "I Don't Like It, I Love It" featuring Robin Thicke, and the single "Heatwave" for Robin Schulz featuring Akon.

In 2014, Troelsen co-wrote and co-produced "We Are One (Ole Ola)", the Official 2014 FIFA World Cup Song, featuring Pitbull and Jennifer Lopez.

History 

As a writer and producer, Troelsen's work has charted globally, with hits such as Lil Wayne's "Can't Be Broken" (#1 Billboard 200), Junior Senior's "Move Your Feet" (#2 UK), "I Don't Like It, I Love It" by Flo Rida feat. Robin Thicke (#7 UK), Aura Dione's "Geronimo" (#1 Germany), Monrose's "Hot Summer" (#1 Germany), and Private's "My Secret Lover" (#1 Denmark).

In 2014, Troelsen co-wrote and co-produced "We Are One (Ole Ola)," the Official 2014 FIFA World Cup Song, featuring Pitbull, Jennifer Lopez, and Claudia Leitte. The song was performed by Pitbull and Jennifer Lopez at the Opening Ceremony of the 2014 World Cup and was included on the "Official 2014 FIFA World Cup Album," released by Sony.

In Asia, Troelsen is regarded as one of the most successful and prolific writers and producers of K-Pop. Troelsen's compositions have sold over 10 million units in Korean and Japan to date. Troelsen wrote TVXQ's single "Mirotic", whose eponymous album was the best-selling album of 2008 in South Korea. Other major K-Pop songs written and produced by Troelsen include SHINee's "Love Like Oxygen", EXO's "History," and TVXQ's "Humanoids."

Troelsen also fronts the pop group Private, whose single "My Secret Lover" was remixed by Diplo and Egyptian Lover and was featured as Record of the Week on Scott Mills and Nick Grimshaw's shows on BBC Radio 1. The song was also featured in a Prada commercial in 2010.

Troelsen owns a recording studio, Delta Lab Studios, in Copenhagen, Denmark, whose design was inspired by Verner Panton and has a vast collection of analog equipment.

Troelsen has been profiled in publications such as Dazed & Confused, NME, and Monocle.

Since July 2011, Troelsen is signed to EMI Music Publishing.

Music in film, television and video games

Thomas Troelsen's compositions have appeared in the following:
Gossip Girl ("Last Dance" and "Suicide")
EA's FIFA 10 ("The Sound of Swing")
Fuel TV ("Suicide")
Lifetime's "Seven Deadly Sins" ("Bang!")
90210 ("Hot Summer")
EA's Boogie Superstar ("Hot Summer")
Clicknet ("Fragment Eight")
Poppy Shakespeare ("Fragment One," "The Sound of Swing" and "The First Picture")
Dong Energy ("The Sound of Swing")
Renault ("The Sound of Swing")
Rock Band 3 ("Last Dance")
Patagonia ("On the Floor")
Google Chromebook ("Move Your Feet")

Thomas has also written jingles for Gametap, Dong Energy, Lalandia, and DK TV.

Discography

Select writing credits & productions 
2003: Move Your Feet by Junior Senior (single) -- featured vocals (chorus), production
2004: Baby by Melody Club (song/single)
2004: "We Love to Boogie", "I'm on Fire", "No.1", "Bombs", "On the Moon" by Remee
2004: "Jul I Angora", "De Skal Ha' Baghjul Nede I Touren", "Ridder-Problemer", "Tennisbolden" from Drengene fra Angora
2006: "Fragment 1 (and I Kept Hearing)", "Fragment 2 (the First Picture) feat. Julee Cruise, "Fragment 8 (The Sound of Swing)" by Kenneth Bager from Fragments from a Space Cadet
2006: Back in Town, Bold as Love, It should be me, It should be you" by Whyte Seeds
2007: Hot Summer by Monrose (single)
2007: Strictly Physical by Monrose (album)
2007: Was Ist Los by Sistanova
2007: The Way That You Love Me (Contigo Pierdo El Control) by Morgana feat. Domino Saints
2007: Hold Nu Kay by JaConfetti from The Rainbow Express2008: Song for Sophie and Something from Nothing by Aura Dione from Columbine
2008: Disappear  by No Angels
2008: Forever or Never (Single),Dysfunctional Family, and How Does it Feel by Cinema Bizarre
2008: Sexy as Hell by Sarah Connor (singer) (album, five tracks)
2008: Under My Skin  by Sarah Connor (single)
2008: Show The World, Magic Lover, Report to the Dancefloor, Mission Impossible, Rock the Party, Girls, Girls, Girls, The Secret by Martin 
2008: Mirotic by TVXQ (single)
2008: Eat You Up by BoA (single)
2008: SHINee World by SHINee
2008: "Dead or Alive" from Electric Cabaret by Infernal
2009: In and Out of Control by The Raveonettes (album)
2009: Material Boy (Don't Look Back) by Jeanette from Undress to the Beat2009: Back to the 80's by Aqua
2009: Oxygen by Alien Beat Club from "Diversity"
2009: "Hot Winter" by Jolin Tsai from "Butterfly"
2010: "My Secret Lover" by PRIVATE
2010: Run Devil Run by Girls' Generation (single)
2010: Echo by Girls' Generation from Oh!
2010: Hurricane Venus by BoA (album, two songs)
2010: Nu ABO by f(x) (album, two tracks)
2010: "Saturday" by Basshunter (single)
2010: "Plastic Fantastic", "Gunshot", "The Weekend and I" by Infernal from Fall from Grace
2010: Sonrisa by Ana Torroja
2010: "The Sound of Swing, Pt. 2 (Oh Na Na) feat. Aloe Blacc, "Fragment 13 (Go Underground)", "Fragment 16 (I Can't Wait)" by Kenneth Bager from "Fragments from a Space Cadet 2"
2011: Showtime by TV-2 (album)
2011: "Mirror Mirror" by Sash! (album)
2011: "Gigolo" and "Army of Love" by Anders-Fahrenkrog
2011: "Hot Summer" by f(x) (single)
2011: Pinocchio by f(x) (album, two songs, "Gangsta Boy" and "Hot Summer")
2011: Perfection by Super Junior-M (EP, one track, "Perfection")
2011: Mr. Simple by Super Junior (Album, two tracks, "Opera" and "Perfection")
2011: "Geronimo" from Before the Dinosaurs by Aura Dione
2011: "Pistolskud" by Infernal from Toppen af Poppen
2011: How R U Doin? by Aqua
2011: "You Could Be the One" by Bream & Blinders
2012: "Everywhere" by PRIVATE feat. O.T. Genasis
2012: "History" by EXO (single)
2011: "Lazy Girl" by Girls Generation
2012: "Criminal" by Vox Halo feat La Dolla
2012: "Single Ladies" and "Hollywood Ending" by Remady & Manu-L feat. J-Son (single)
2012: "Spy" by Super Junior
2012: "Outsider" by Super Junior
2012: "Sherlock", "Clue" and "Note" by Shinee
2012: "Humanoids" by TVXQ!
2012: "Señorita" by Abraham Mateo
2012: "Tonight" by Alexandra Burke from Heartbreak on Hold
2012: "Out the Water" by Fabio Lendrum from Alpha
2012: "Hate That I Love You" by Kristoffer Rahbek
2013: "Why Not" by 2YOON from Harvest Moon
2013: "Spoiler" by Shinee from Chapter 1. Dream Girl – The Misconceptions of You
2013: "Girls, Girls, Girls" by Shinee from Chapter 1. Dream Girl – The Misconceptions of You
2013: "Punch Drunk Love" by Shinee from Chapter 1. Dream Girl – The Misconceptions of You
2013: "Like a Fire" by Shinee from Chapter 2. Why So Serious? – The Misconceptions of Me
2013: "More Than Friends", "Tonight", "World of Love" by Inna from Party Never Ends
2013: "Marabou" by Antonia
2013: "Get You Back" by Wally Lopez feat. Ricki-Lee
2013: "Waiting for the End" by Marco V
2013: "Everybody" by Shinee
2013: "Fridays Are Forever" by The Fooo
2013: "What's Your Name Girl?" by Jealous Much? feat. The Airplane Boys
2013: "Why Not" by 2YOON from "Harvest Moon" 
2014: "We Are One (Ole, Ola)" by Pitbull feat. Jennifer Lopez and Claudia Leitte
2014: "Good Time" by Inna feat. Pitbull from LatINNA
2014: "Butterfly" by f(x) from Red Light
2014: "Danger" by TAEMIN (Shinee) from ACE
2014: "Body And The Sun" by Inna from Summer Days
2014: "Kiss You" by Sasha Lopez
2014: "Who I Am" by Abraham Mateo from Who I AM
2014: "Save The Night" by Dirty Dasmo
2014: "Happy People" by Robots Don't Sleep
2014: "The Way That You Love Me" by Morgana
2014: "Remember to Forget" by Carlprit feat. Jaicko
2015: "I Don't Like It, I Love It" by Flo Rida feat. Robin Thicke and Verdine White
2015: "Here it Is" by Flo Rida feat. Chris Brown
2015: "That's What I Like" by Flo Rida feat. Fitz
2015: "Need Somebody" by M. Pokora from R.E.D.
2015: "God Invented Fridays" by DJ Luis López
2015: "Back in the Old School" by Chic feat. Nile Rodgers
2015: "We Wanna" by Alexandra Stan & Inna feat. Daddy Yankee
2015: "Chemicals" by Tiësto & Don Diablo feat. Thomas Troelsen
2015: "Heatwave" by Robin Schulz feat. Akon from Sugar
2015: "Day Trippin'" by Kaskade feat. Estelle from Automatic
2015: INNA by Inna (5 tracks, Bop Bop, "Walking On the Sun", "Rendez Vous", "Body and The Sun", "Sun Goes Up")
2015: "Company" by Justin Bieber from Purpose
2015: "Dirty Mind" by Flo Rida
2015: "Fired Cuz I Was Late" by AronChupa
2016: "Up All Night" by Charlie Puth from Nine Track Mind
2016: "Hello Friday" by Flo Rida feat. Jason Derulo
2016: "I Love Me" by Meghan Trainor feat. LunchMoney Lewis
2016: "This One's For You by David Guetta feat. Zara Larsson
2016: "Who Did You Love" by Flo Rida feat. Arianna
2016: "Kiss The Sky" by Jason Derulo
2016: "Debut" by Maria Hazell
2016: "Karma" by Julian Perretta
2016: "Chewing Gum" by NCT Dream
2017: "I Got Love" by Taeyeon
2017: "Yes" by Sam Feldt featuring Akon
2017: "Private Dancer" by Julian Perretta and Feder
2017: "Nirvana", "In My Dreams" by Inna from Nirvana
2018: "Found You" by Don Diablo featuring Bullysongs from Future
2018: "Bed of Roses" by Afrojack featuring Stanaj
2018: "Jennie" by Felix Jaehn featuring R. City
2018: “Who’s Up” by LunchMoney Lewis
2018: "Do You Wanna Party?" by Nile Rodgers & Chic featuring LunchMoney Lewis
2018: "Say My Name" by David Guetta featuring J Balvin and Bebe Rexha from 7
2018: "Diamond Heart" by Alan Walker featuring Sophia Somajo from Different World
2018: "Can't Be Broken" by Lil Wayne from Tha Carter V
2018: "Lost Control" by Alan Walker from Different World
2018: "Truth" by TVXQ from New Chapter #2: The Truth of Love
2018: "Alabama" by Almeda feat. Burak Yeter
2019: "Leyla" by Mesto
2019: "Sober" by Afrojack featuring Rae Sremmurd & Stanaj
2019: "BITCH (takes one to know one)" by Lennon Stella
2019: "Show Me" by Key
2019: "Girls Gotta Live" by FAKY
2019: "Last Man in the World" by Aura Dione
2019: "Follow" by Yunho from True Colors
2019: "I Can't Stand the Rain" by Super M
2020: "Chocolate" by Changmin from Chocolate 
2020: "Piano" by Changmin from Chocolate
2020: "All Day" by Asher Angel
2020: "Go to God", "Toilet Paper", "Quarantine Blues", "Thank You" by LunchMoney Lewis from Songs in the Key of Quarantine
2020 "Inside Out" by Steve Aoki with Felix Jaehn feat. Jamie Scott from Neon Future IV
2020 "Looking to Love" by Nick Talos feat. Chelcee Grimes
2020 "Numbers" by JAMIE Park Ji-min feat. JMIN
2021 "Time Machine" and "Loco" by U-Know Yunho
2021 "No Numbers" by JAMIE Park Ji-min feat. Changmo
2021 "...Dummy" by Cheat Codes feat. Oli Sykes from Hellraisers, Part 2
2021 "Don't Stop" by LunchMoney Lewis feat. Trinidad James
2022 "Stay With You" by Afrojack, Dubvision, Manse
2022 "Bullet" by Benjamin Ingrosso from PLAYLIST
2022 "The One" by Nghtmre and Klaxx
2022 "Seasick" by Dragonette
2022 "Go Up" by Jay B

References 

1981 births
Living people
Danish composers
Male composers
Danish pop musicians
Danish record producers
Danish songwriters
People from Skive Municipality